George Raymond Souders (September 11, 1900 - July 26, 1976) was an American race car driver who won the 1927 Indianapolis 500.

Born in Lafayette, Indiana, George Souders led the last 51 laps of the 1927 race after starting in 22nd position as a race rookie.

For a book on the history of the "500", Souders offered this succinct summation of his career:

"I quit Purdue when my father died. I worked in a garage and rode on dirt tracks. That car I rode on 1927, it was smooth handling. And the engine was the smallest to ever win at Indianapolis. The piston displacement was just under 90 (cubic inches). The car was the most expensive the Duesenbergs ever built for racing. It cost around $50,000, I was told. A year later (1928) I finished third at Indianapolis. In the summer of '28 I raced in Detroit--a $1000 race, nothing much, and was guaranteed $750 just for showing up--but...you want to win. Anyway, I had an awful spill. I was unconscious six months and never raced after that."

Indianapolis 500 results

References

External links

 

1900 births
1976 deaths
Indianapolis 500 drivers
Indianapolis 500 winners
Sportspeople from Lafayette, Indiana
Racing drivers from Indiana
Burials in Indiana
AAA Championship Car drivers